The India–Bangladesh enclaves, also known as the chiṭmahals ( chiṭmôhôl) and sometimes called pasha enclaves, were the enclaves along the Bangladesh–India border, in Bangladesh and the Indian states of West Bengal, Tripura, Assam and Meghalaya. The main body of Bangladesh contained 102 Indian enclaves, which in turn contained 21 Bangladeshi counter-enclaves, one of which contained Dahala Khagrabari, an Indian counter-counter-enclave, the world's only third-order enclave when it existed. The Indian mainland contained 71 Bangladeshi enclaves, which in turn contained 3 Indian counter-enclaves. A joint census in 2010 found 51,549 people who were residing in these enclaves: 37,334 in Indian enclaves within Bangladesh and 14,215 in Bangladeshi enclaves within India.

The Prime Ministers of India and Bangladesh signed the Land Boundary Agreement in 1974 to exchange enclaves and simplify their international border. A revised version of the agreement was adopted by the two countries on 7 May 2015, when the Parliament of India passed the 100th Amendment to the Constitution of India. Under this agreement, which was ratified on 6 June 2015, India received 51 Bangladeshi enclaves (covering  ) in the Indian mainland, while Bangladesh received 111 Indian enclaves (covering ) in the Bangladeshi mainland. The enclave residents were allowed to either continue residing at their present location or move to the country of their choice. The exchange of enclaves was to be implemented in phases between 31 July 2015 and 30 June 2016. The enclaves were exchanged at midnight on 31 July 2015 and the transfer of enclave residents was completed on 30 November 2015.

Since the exchange of territory took place, the only remaining enclave is Dahagram–Angarpota, an exclave of Bangladesh.

History

According to a popular legend, the enclaves were used as stakes in card or chess games centuries ago between two regional kings, the Raja of Koch Bihar and the Maharaja of Rangpur. As far as historical records are concerned, the little territories were apparently the result of a confused outcome of a 1713 treaty between the Kingdom of Koch Bihar and the Mughal Empire. Possibly, the Kingdom and the Mughals ended a war without determining a boundary for what territories had been gained or lost.

After the partition of India in 1947, Rangpur was joined to East Pakistan. Cooch Behar State, with its exclaves and holes, was a native state, whose Raja had the option of joining either India or Pakistan. Cooch Behar district was merged in 1949 with India. The desire to "de-enclave" most of the enclaves was manifested in a 1958 agreement between Jawaharlal Nehru and Feroz Khan Noon, the respective Prime Ministers, for an exchange between India and Pakistan without considering loss or gain of territory. But the matter then worked into a Supreme Court case in India, and the Supreme Court ruled that a constitutional amendment was required to transfer the land, so the ninth amendment was introduced to facilitate the implementation of the agreement. The amendment could not be passed because of objections to the transfer of the southern Berubari enclave. Because of India's deteriorated relations with Pakistan, the issue remained unsolved. Negotiations restarted after East Pakistan became independent as Bangladesh in 1971 following the Bangladesh Liberation War.

Agreement

The Land Boundary Agreement was signed on 16 May 1974 between Indira Gandhi and Sheikh Mujibur Rahman which provided for the exchange of enclaves and the surrender of adverse possessions. Under the agreement, India retained the Berubari Union No. 12 enclave while Bangladesh retained the Dahagram-Angorpota exclaves with India providing access to it by giving a  corridor, called the Tin Bigha Corridor. Bangladesh quickly ratified the agreement in 1974 but India failed to do so. The Tin Bigha Corridor was leased to Bangladesh in 1992 amid local opposition.

The list of enclaves was prepared in 1997 by the two countries. Two Joint Boundary Working Groups were formed to work out the details of enclaves in 2001. A joint census was carried out in May 2007. In September 2011, India signed the Additional Protocol for the 1974 Land Boundary Agreement with Bangladesh. Both nations announced an intention to swap 162 enclaves, giving residents a choice of nationality.

Under the agreement, India received 51 of the 71 Bangladeshi enclaves (from 51 to 54 of the 74 chhits) that were inside India proper, while Bangladesh received 95 to 101 of the 103 Indian enclaves (111 out of 119 chhits) that were inside Bangladesh proper. India acquired  adverse possession areas and transferred  adverse possession areas to Bangladesh. After the exchange of enclaves, India lost around 40 km2 (10,000 acres) to Bangladesh. According to July 2010 joint census, there were 14,215 people residing in Bangladeshi enclaves in India and 37,269 people residing in Indian enclaves in Bangladesh. The people living in these enclaves without a nationality were allowed to choose their nationality.

The Constitution (119th Amendment) Bill, 2013 was introduced in the Rajya Sabha, the upper house of the Parliament of India, on 18 December 2013. Nationalist groups in Assam strongly opposed the bill, which would cause India to lose 10,000 acres of land, but Indian Prime Minister Narendra Modi supported it because it would make the border with Bangladesh easier to manage. The parliament panel, Standing Committee on External Affairs, approved the bill in November 2014. The Rajya Sabha approved the constitutional amendment on 6 May 2015, and the Lok Sabha approved it the following day. President of India Pranab Mukherjee gave his assent to the Act on 28 May 2015.

On 6 June 2015, Modi ratified the agreement during his visit to the Bangladesh capital Dhaka. In the presence of Modi and Bangladeshi Prime Minister Sheikh Hasina, the foreign secretaries of the two countries signed the instruments of the land exchange. The exchange of enclaves and land parcels in adverse possession, and the boundary demarcation, was implemented in phases between 31 July 2015 and 30 June 2016. The enclaves were to be exchanged at midnight on 31 July 2015 and the boundary demarcation was to be completed by 30 June 2016 by Survey Departments of the respective countries. The transfer of enclave residents was expected to be completed by 30 November 2015.

Indian and Bangladeshi officials conducted a field survey of enclave residents between 6 July 2015 and 16 July 2015. Seventy-five teams, made up of one Indian and one Bangladeshi member each, were tasked with conducting the enumeration. Twenty-five teams surveyed the Bangladeshi enclaves which would be transferred to India, while 50 worked on the Indian enclaves that would be transferred to Bangladesh. As the enclave residents were allowed to choose citizenship of either nation, by 13 July 2015, 100 families residing in the Indian enclaves applied for Indian citizenship, while none of the residents of the Bangladeshi enclaves chose to go to Bangladesh. New citizenship, if chosen, took effect from 1 August 2015. Nearly 14,000 people living in the former Bangladeshi enclaves became Indian citizens, while about 36,000 people living in the former Indian enclaves became Bangladeshi citizens. Some 1,000 people in the former Indian enclaves chose Indian citizenship and were to be relocated to India by December 2015.

Notable enclaves

Bangladesh

Dahagram–Angarpota: The largest Bangladeshi composite enclave (combining the first- and third-largest Bangladeshi chhits by area), administered as part of Patgram Upazila in Lalmonirhat Zila, lies within the Indian province of West Bengal. The enclave lacks basic facilities. The lone health complex remains virtually useless because of lack of power supply, as India refused to allow Bangladesh to run power lines to the enclave. After the exchange of enclaves in July 2015, Bangladesh retained it as an exclave.

It is available for use by the residents of Dahagram–Angarpota.

India

Dasiar Chhara, the fourth largest Indian chhit by area, was the largest stand-alone Indian enclave (i.e., not a composite of adjoining chhits).

Dahala Khagrabari, enclave #51, was the world's only third-order enclave, being a piece of India within Bangladesh, within India, within Bangladesh. It was the site of a jute field, owned by a Bangladeshi farmer living in the Bangladeshi second-order enclave surrounding Dahala Khagrabari. As part of the 2015 border agreement, India ceded it to Bangladesh.

List of former enclaves and exclaves

Schematic overview:

Some individual enclaves were composed of several administrative units (chhits and/or mauzas).  These administrative units must be differentiated from the enclave as a whole. "This is particularly important for the Cooch Behar enclaves, where the several administrative units which together form some of the larger enclaves are commonly, but wrongly, termed enclaves themselves, or where one component unit commonly lends its name to the whole enclave. ... [T]he official Indo–Bangladesh Boundary Commission figure of 111 Indian and 51 Bangladeshi exchangeable enclaves would appear to count only individual mauzas, even when these consisted of more than one enclave." There is not a one-to-one relationship between enclaves, chhits and mauzas.

All of the information shown in the following two tables has been assembled from Brendan R. Whyte.

Bangladesh

In order to distinguish chhits having the same names, serial numbers established by Banerjee (1966) are shown in parentheses, as (#).  The Bangladesh series is separate from the India series.

With 4 exceptions (Chhat Tilai, Baikunthapur Teldhar (#3, #4, #5)), the first-order enclaves, including the 3 composite enclaves, lay entirely within the Cooch Behar District of West Bengal state, India.  All 21 counter-enclaves lay within the Rangpur Division of Bangladesh. The Bangladeshi enclaves had an estimated population of 14,215 in 2015.

❋ This chhit was part of a composite enclave and by itself was neither an enclave nor an exclave.
† Stated size may not be exact.

India

The 102 first-order enclaves (including the 6 composite enclaves) and the 1 counter-counter enclave lay within the Rangpur Division of Bangladesh.
The 3 counter-enclaves lay within the Cooch Behar District of West Bengal state, India. In order to distinguish chhits having the same names, serial numbers established by Banerjee (1966) are shown in parentheses, as (#).  The India series is separate from the Bangladesh series. There were 37,334 people living in the Indian enclaves in 2015.

❋ This chhit was part of a composite enclave and by itself was neither an enclave nor an exclave.
† Stated size may not be exact.

See also

 List of enclaves and exclaves
 Baarle-Hertog in Belgium
 Baarle-Nassau in the Netherlands
 Büsingen in Switzerland
 Campione d'Italia in Switzerland
 Vennbahn in Belgium

References

Bangladesh and the Commonwealth of Nations
India and the Commonwealth of Nations
Enclaves
Territorial disputes of Bangladesh
Territorial disputes of India
Bangladesh–India relations
Geography of West Bengal
Former enclaves
Enclaves and exclaves